German submarine U-339 was a Type VIIC U-boat of Nazi Germany's Kriegsmarine during World War II. The submarine was laid down on 7 July 1941 at the Nordseewerke yard at Emden as yard number 211, launched on 30 June 1942 and commissioned on 25 August under the command of Kapitänleutnant Georg-Wilhelm Basse.

The U-boat spent most of her career as a training vessel. She sank or damaged no ships.

She was scuttled on 5 May 1945 at war's end near Wilhelmshaven.

Design
German Type VIIC submarines were preceded by the shorter Type VIIB submarines. U-339 had a displacement of  when at the surface and  while submerged. She had two shafts and two  propellers.

U-339 was fitted with five  torpedo tubes (four fitted at the bow and one at the stern), fourteen torpedoes, one  SK C/35 naval gun, 220 rounds, and two twin  C/30 anti-aircraft guns. The boat had a complement of between forty-four and sixty.

Service history
The boat's service life began with training with the 8th U-boat Flotilla from 25 August 1942. She was then transferred to the 11th flotilla on 1 March 1943. She was reassigned to the 22nd flotilla on 1 April.

Fate
The boat was seriously damaged by depth charges dropped from a British PBY Catalina of No. 190 Squadron RAF on 26 March 1943. As a result, she spent the rest of the war as a training vessel.

She was scuttled near Wilhelmshaven on 5 May 1945.

References

Bibliography

External links
 

German Type VIIC submarines
U-boats commissioned in 1942
World War II submarines of Germany
1943 ships
Ships built in Emden
Operation Regenbogen (U-boat)
Maritime incidents in May 1945